Szeged is a district in southern part of Csongrád County. Szeged is also the name of the town where the district seat is found. The district is located in the Southern Great Plain Statistical Region.

Geography 
Szeged District borders with Kistelek District to the northwest, Hódmezővásárhely District to the northeast, Makó District to the east, the Serbian districts of North Banat to the east and North Bačka to the south, Mórahalom District to the west. The number of the inhabited places in Szeged District is 13.

Municipalities 
The district has 1 urban county, 1 town, 1 large village and 10 villages.
(ordered by population, as of 1 January 2012)

The bolded municipalities are cities, italics municipality is large village.

Demographics

In 2011, it had a population of 204,263 and the population density was 276/km².

Ethnicity
Besides the Hungarian majority, the main minorities are the Roma (approx. 2,000), Serb and German (1,700), Romanian (750), Slovak (400), Croat (300), Russian and Arab (200), Polish (150), Chinese, Bulgarian, Ukrainian, Greek and Armenian (100).

Total population (2011 census): 204,263
Ethnic groups (2011 census): Identified themselves: 183,577 persons:
Hungarians: 172,834 (94.15%)
Gypsies: 1,932 (1.05%)
Others and indefinable: 8,811 (4.80%)
Approx. 21,000 persons in Szeged District did not declare their ethnic group at the 2011 census.

Religion
Religious adherence in the county according to 2011 census:

Catholic – 79,614 (Roman Catholic – 78,826; Greek Catholic – 762);
Reformed – 9,328;
Evangelical – 2,105;
Orthodox – 457;
other religions – 4,533; 
Non-religious – 42,459; 
Atheism – 4,187;
Undeclared – 61,580.

Gallery

See also
List of cities and towns of Hungary

References

https://www.citypopulation.de/en/hungary/admin/csongr%C3%A1d/075__szeged/

External links
 Postal codes of the Szeged District

Districts in Csongrád-Csanád County